Montreuil-sur-Maine (literally Montreuil on Maine) is a commune in the Maine-et-Loire department in western France.

Geography
The Oudon forms the commune's south-western border. The Mayenne flows south through the middle of the commune.

See also
Communes of the Maine-et-Loire department

References

Montreuilsurmaine